Ján Leško (born 6 July 1986 in Vranov nad Topľou) is a Slovak football defender who currently plays for TVEC85 Les Sables d'Olonne. He previously played for LAFC Lučenec, FC Nitra, MFK Zemplín Michalovce, MFK Vranov nad Topľou and SFC Opava

References

External links
  at fcnitra.sk 

1986 births
Living people
Slovak footballers
Association football defenders
MFK Vranov nad Topľou players
MFK Zemplín Michalovce players
FC Nitra players
Slovak Super Liga players
MŠK Novohrad Lučenec players
People from Vranov nad Topľou
Sportspeople from the Prešov Region
SFC Opava players